Midway is an unincorporated community in Clark County, Arkansas, United States.

References

Unincorporated communities in Clark County, Arkansas
Unincorporated communities in Arkansas